{{family name hatnote|Sandioriva, her Gayonese patronymic surname}}

Qory Sandioriva (born August 17, 1991), is an Indonesian actress and beauty pageant titleholder. She was crowned as Puteri Indonesia 2009 on October 9, 2009 by her predecessor, Zivanna Letisha Siregar.  Currently she's the youngest titleholder in Puteri Indonesia's history and the first ever woman from Nanggroe Aceh Darussalam province to win the title.

Early life

Sandioriva was born in Jakarta to a Gayonese father and a Sundanese mother. She attended the Al-Azhar School for her elementary and secondary education. During high school, Sandioriva joined the Pencak Silat and choir team of her school and won a choir competition.  She studied at the University of Indonesia majoring in French literature.Puteri Indonesia 2009 Berbohong Soal Jilbab?

Pageantry
Puteri Indonesia 2009
Her participation in Puteri Indonesia 2009 was controversial because she was representing the province of Nanggroe Aceh Darussalam, a conservative Muslim province ruled by Sharia law. Past representatives of Nanggroe Aceh Darussalam had always worn a headscarf (hijab), but Sandioriva did not. Sandioriva later explained that despite not wearing a headscarf, she still upheld traditional values and morals – just like the Acehnese heroine she admired, Cut Nyak Dhien.

Miss Universe 2010
As the official representative of her country to the 2010 Miss Universe pageant broadcast live from Las Vegas, Nevadaon August 23, Sandioriva participated as one of the 83 delegates who vied for the crown of eventual winner, Ximena Navarrete of Mexico.

When she was asked what was the best advice she could give to a man, she said "I think when you down the women can make you up, and I think the women can be said that "I have advice for you" if you way up, you have to be nice with people, include women, so when you down, women can be nice with you." John Berthelsen of the Jakarta Globe'' said "Allowing for the fact that she speaks very little English, Sandioriva’s answer makes a certain amount of sense — put simply, that men should recognize that if you occupy a lofty position, you’d better be nice because when you sink, you will need people’s help."

Filmography

Movies

References

External links

 
 Qory Sandioriva Official Instagram

1991 births
Indonesian Muslims
Living people
Miss Universe 2010 contestants
People from Jakarta
Puteri Indonesia winners
Gayonese people
Sundanese people